Pantophilus (meaning "more love") is a genus of prehistoric fish.

References

Prehistoric aulopiformes